The siege of Mirandola took part in 1551, carried on by Pope Julius III against the city, which had allied with France during the last of the Italian Wars.

As during  the War of the League of Cambrai, the fortified city-state of Mirandola had again allied with France. Like his predecessor Julius II had made in 1511, Pope Julius III in 1551 sent against it an army under generals Camillo Orsini and Alessandro Vitelleschi, along with his nephew, Giovanni Battista del Monte, who later proved inept at military matters. Despite the alliance with the Emperor Charles V and his imperial support, the siege dragged on for months due to rivalry between the papal commanders. Differently from the 1511 siege, the ditches did not get iced, and sallies from besieged knights hampered communications between the four forts built by the besiegers around the citadel.

In Spring, the siege continued with no result, waiting for a corps of Landsknechts to be sent by Charles from Germany. However, in March 1552, a Mirandolese raid surprised the pope's nephew while hunting and killed him. The pope wrote to the emperor that he would abandon the siege.

Sources

Mirandola
Mirandola
Mirandola 1551
Sieges of Mirandola
Mirandola 1551
1551 in Italy
1552 in Italy
1550s in the Papal States
Italian War of 1551–1559
Pope Julius III